Omaha School District is a public school district in Boone County, Arkansas, United States which serves the city of Omaha (Arkansas) and surrounding unincorporated areas within Boone County.

Schools 
Omaha High School serves ninth to twelfth grades. In the 2009-2010 academic year, the total enrollment in the school was 185 and total full-time teachers was 24.60, with a teacher/student ratio of 7.52.

Omaha Elementary School serves pre-school to sixth grades. In the 2009-2010 academic year, the total enrollment in the school was 284 and total full-time teachers was 22.40, with a teacher/student ratio of 12.68.

Demographics
Within the geographic area covered by the Omaha School District, there were 590 individuals under the age of 18, during the 2009-2010 academic year.

See also
 List of school districts in Arkansas

References

External links
 Omaha School District web site 
 Omaha School District Board of Education
 Omaha School District Board of Education Policy
 Boone County School District Reference Map (US Census Bureau, 2010)
 Omaha School District (National Center for Education Statistics)
 2010 Arkansas Legislative Audit for the Omaha School District

School districts in Arkansas
Schools in Boone County, Arkansas
Education in Boone County, Arkansas